

Cabinet

Sources

Government of South Africa
Executive branch of the government of South Africa
Cabinets of South Africa
1929 establishments in South Africa
1933 disestablishments in South Africa
Cabinets established in 1929
Cabinets disestablished in 1933